FC Marlène is a futsal club based in Heerhugowaard, Netherlands.

Squad 2009-2010

Honours
Source:
3 Topdivisie: 2004, 2006, 2009
5 Dutch Futsal Cup: 2004, 2005, 2006, 2007, 2009
2 Dutch Futsal Super Cup: 2005, 2006, 2008

References

External links
Official Website

Futsal clubs in the Netherlands
Futsal clubs established in 1973
1973 establishments in the Netherlands
Sport in Dijk en Waard